Mont Ventoux Hill Climb is a car and motorcycle hillclimbing race course near Avignon in France.

In 1970: "Andre Willem of Belgium was killed June 20 in practice for the Mont Ventoux Hill Climb near Carpentras. His Lotus Formula 3 car slid off the road and struck a tree."

A shortened version of the course was used in 1976. A revival meeting called "Ronde du Ventoux" was held in 2009.

Winners of the Mont Ventoux Hill Climb

Key: R = Course Record.

See also 
 European Hill Climb Championship
 Championnat de France de la Montagne

Footnotes

External links 
 Daily Telegraph: 
 History in French:

Hillclimbs
Historic motorsport events
Auto races in France